The Arta Mountains, also known as the Great Mountains of Arta are a mountain range in Djibouti. The mountains lie to the south of the Gulf of Tadjoura, in the Arta Region. They are situated approximately 35 kilometres (21 mi) west of the capital Djibouti City, and 69 kilometres (43 mi) by road from Ali Sabieh. The Issa Somali have a long history in the Arta Mountains.

History
The first known people that inhabited the mountain are the Issa Somali. The most famous town in the area is the town of Arta. The French people in Djibouti travelled here when Djibouti city is difficult because of the heat in the summer.

Climate
Arta Mountains has a hot semi-arid climate (Köppen BSh) surrounded by a hot desert climate (BWh). So it has a mild fresh weather, The climate is greatly affected by its varying geographic features. Due to its location at 755 metres (2,477 ft) above sea level, Arta Mountains climate is very warm summers and cool winters. The area attracts visitors looking for a moderate climate and pristine, scenic views. Precipitation is higher, and temperatures are lower, than in many other towns in Djibouti due to its high altitude in the Arta Mountains.

See also
Arta Region

References

Mountains of Djibouti
Arta Region